The 1886–87 season was the fourth to be played by the team that are now known as Bristol Rovers, and their third playing under the name Eastville Rovers.

Season review
As with each of their previous three seasons, Eastville Rovers continued to play only friendly matches this year, but the "dribbling code" (as it was sometimes called at the time) of football was now gaining in popularity and the club were beginning to play against a wider variety of opposition. New team colours of Oxford and Cambridge blue were adopted, although the precise design of the kit is not documented.

Two Eastville Rovers players took part in an unusual match on New Year's Day, when Clifton Association took on a Rest of Bristol XI in Warmley. The Rest of Bristol team consisted of players from Warmley, St George and Eastville Rovers, and included Rovers pair W. Perrin and H. Horsey in the forward line.

Eastville Rovers were still not particularly well-known at this point, as evidenced by the fact that Weston-super-Mare RFC arranged two matches against them believing them to be a rugby team. Later, when Weston discovered that Rovers were an association football club, the games were cancelled.

Most of the results from this season are not known, but of the games where a result is documented Rovers recorded three wins, two draws and a defeat.

Results

First team

Second team

References

Bibliography

Bristol Rovers F.C. seasons
Eastville Rovers